Connorsville is an unincorporated community in Dunn County, Wisconsin, United States, located along the South Fork of the Hay River in the town of New Haven.

Andy Pafko, major league baseball player, began his career with Connorsville's amateur club in the Dunn County League in 1937.

References

Unincorporated communities in Dunn County, Wisconsin
Unincorporated communities in Wisconsin